"Voyelles" or "Vowels" is a sonnet in alexandrines by Arthur Rimbaud, written in 1871 but first published in 1883.  Its theme is the different characters of the vowels, which it associates with those of colours.  It has become one of the most studied poems in the French language, provoking very diverse interpretations.

History 

They differ mainly in punctuation, though the second word of the fourth line appears as bombillent in one manuscript and as bombinent in the other. The meaning in both cases is "buzz".

Voyelles was written by September 1871 and therefore before Rimbaud's 17th birthday.  It was Verlaine who published it, in the 5–12 October 1883 number of the review .

Text 

The two texts below are of the 1905  edition, and of a 2015 translation by George J. Dance.

Interpretations and analyses 

This sonnet has been written about more than almost any other poem in the French language. It has been suggested, for example, that the poem draws on Rimbaud's memories of children's coloured cubes marked with the letters of the alphabet that he may have handled in his infancy. Others have seen the influence on Rimbaud of his reading of esoteric and cabbalistic literature, or of his own conception of the voyant, "seer", adumbrated in his "Lettre du voyant". According to Robert Faurisson, a secondary school teacher in Vichy in the early 1960s, it is an erotic poem; this interpretation provoked a debate which brought into play the national media, including Le Monde, and several academics, including René Étiemble. It has also been argued by several critics that there is no system behind the choice of correspondances to the various vowels.

Claude Lévi-Strauss 

Claude Lévi-Strauss explained the sonnet, not by the direct relation between vowels and colours stated in the first line, but by an analogy between two oppositions, the opposition between vowels on the one hand, between colours on the other.

While the phoneme /a/ generally evokes the colour red, Rimbaud associates it, like a provocation, with black. In fact, the A (most saturated phoneme) is opposed to E (silent e), as black is opposed to white.  

The red of the I, a more truly chromatic colour, then opposes the achromatic black and white that precede it.  The green U follows the red I, "the red/green chromatic opposition is maximum like the black/white achromatic opposition which it succeeds".  However, from the phonetic point of view, the strongest opposition to the I is the sound ou and not the U: Rimbaud would have chosen to oppose the I to the U, for lack of a French vowel specific to the sound ou.  

There remains then only one vowel, the O, but two colours, blue and yellow.  Under the blue of the O, the yellow of the Clairon ("Trumpet") appears in the second tercet, as the bright red was underlying the black A in the first quatrain: the O contains the blue/yellow opposition, an opposition analogous to that of red and green.  In the last line, blue, the most saturated colour after red, is darkened by mixing it with red, thus referring to the black A at the beginning of the sonnet.

Note

References 

1871 poems
Arthur Rimbaud
French poems
Sonnets
Synesthesia